Sidney City Airport , formerly known as Sidney Municipal Airport, is a city-owned public-use airport located three nautical miles (6 km) south of the central business district of Sidney, a city in Shelby County, Ohio, United States. It is included in the National Plan of Integrated Airport Systems for 2011–2015, which categorized it as a general aviation facility.

Facilities and aircraft 
Sidney City Airport covers an area of 265 acres (107 ha) at an elevation of 1,044 feet (318 m) above mean sea level. It has two runways with asphalt surfaces: 10/28 is 5,013 by 75 feet (1,528 x 23 m) and 5/23 is 2,981 by 50 feet (909 x 15 m).

For the 12-month period ending August 1, 2014, the airport had 20,500 aircraft operations, an average of 56 per day: 99% general aviation, 1% air taxi, and <1% military. At that time there were 37 aircraft based at this airport: 87% single-engine, 8% jet, and 5% multi-engine.

References

External links 
 Airport page at City of Sidney website
 Aerial image as of April 1994 from USGS The National Map
 

Airports in Ohio
Transportation in Shelby County, Ohio